Odin Planitia is a large basin on Mercury located at 23.3° N, 171.6° W. It was named after the Norse god Odin in 1976 by the IAU. A large volcanic dome 7 km in diameter and 1.4 km high is situated near the center of Odin.

Odin Planitia is located east of the Caloris basin.  The southern portion is mapped on the Tolstoj quadrangle, and the northern portion is on the Shakespeare quadrangle.

References

Surface features of Mercury